The Oceanic Preservation Society is a California-based 501(c)(3) non-profit organization that promotes marine conservation and environmental protection by combating complex global issues such as biodiversity loss, climate change, illegal wildlife trading, deforestation, and unsustainable fishing through documentary, film and media. It was founded in 2005 by photographer and current award-winning Executive Director Louie Psihoyos and Silicon Valley entrepreneur Jim Clark. In 2009, OPS released The Cove, an Academy Award-winning documentary film that describes the annual mass slaughter of dolphins in a national park at Taiji, Wakayama.

The organization's second project, Emmy-nominated documentary, Racing Extinction, focuses on the mass extinction of species, disappearance of coral reefs, and the rise of toxins in the ocean.

In addition to documentary film projects, OPS is actively working to save our oceans and planet through collaborative impact campaigns that connect a global network of partners, including conservation organizations, frontline defenders, and policy makers. Confronting the greatest threats to environment, like climate change, unsustainable fishing, the commercial wildlife trade, and deforestation requires action from each of us.

Mission statement
Oceanic Preservation Society (OPS) works to inspire, empower, and connect a global community of activists, using film and visual displays to expose the most critical issues facing our planet.

Films
The Cove - Winner of the Academy Award for Best Documentary, 2009. The film follows an elite team of activists, filmmakers, and freedivers as they embark on a covert mission to penetrate a remote and hidden cove in Taiji, Japan, exposing a deadly secret of unparalleled cruelty where dolphins must fight for their lives to survive. This OPS project demonstrates how film, along with social media, can ignite a global movement.
Racing Extinction - In Racing Extinction, Academy Award-winning director Louie Psihoyos assembles a team that goes undercover to reveal the threat of mass extinction worldwide - a serious issue driven by the international wildlife trade and the collateral damage from the relentless burning of fossil fuels and the beef industry’s greenhouse gas emissions.
The Game Changers- Directed by Louie Psihoyos and executive produced by James Cameron, The Game Changers tells the story of James Wilks — elite special forces trainer and winner of The Ultimate Fighter — as he travels the world on a quest for the truth behind the widely held belief that meat is necessary for protein, strength and optimal health.
Leuser: The Last Place on Earth - This action-adventure documentary, currently in production, delves deep into the extraordinary Leuser Ecosystem — the last place on earth where orangutans, rhinos, tigers, and elephants still roam freely in the wild. An undercover film team chronicles the plights of the heroes fighting to save this biodiversity hotspot on the Island of Sumatra, Indonesia from rampant corruption and destruction — and through their journey, it becomes clear that the difference between life and death in this distant land lies in the decisions each of us makes every day.
Mission: Joy - Directed by Louie Psihoyos and Peggy Callahan, Mission: Joy captures the special relationship between the Dali Lama and Archbishop Desmond Tutu, and traces their life stories. The two men are opposites in many ways, but their friendship proves that our shared humanity is bigger than our differences. Their lives remind us that joy comes from inside, that joy and pain are inseparable, and that deep connection is one of the secrets of joy.

Projecting Change
Utilizing state-of-the-art technology, OPS's project "Projecting Change" highlights environmental beauty and biodiversity fragility through the projection of images onto iconic buildings and other structures with creative partner Obscura Digita. To date, OPS global projection events have achieved over 5.3 Billion impressions. 
United Nations: “IllUmiNations: Protecting Our Planet” - projection event at the United Nations in New York City on September 20, 2014 achieved 42+ million impressions.
Empire State Building: “Projecting Change” - projection event at the Empire State Building in New York City on August 1, 2015 achieved 939+ million impressions.
St. Peter's Basilica, The Vatican: “Illuminating Our Common Home” - projection event at St. Peter’s Basilica at The Vatican on December 8, 2015 achieved 4.4+ billion impressions.

References

External links
 Official website

Marine conservation organizations
Nature conservation organizations based in the United States
501(c)(3) organizations
Organizations established in 2005
Environmental organizations established in 2005
Environmental organizations based in California